Bunsen may refer to:
 Christian Charles Josias Bunsen (1791–1860), Prussian diplomat and scholar
 Frances Bunsen (1791–1876), or Baroness Bunsen, Welsh painter and author, wife of Christian Charles Josias Bunsen
 Robert Bunsen (1811–1899), German chemist, after whom is named:
 Bunsen burner
 Bunsen cell
 Bunsen crater on the moon
 10361 Bunsen, an asteroid
 Bunsen Reaction
 The Bunsen–Kirchhoff Award, a German award for spectroscopy
 Sir Maurice de Bunsen (1852–1932), British diplomat
 Dr. Bunsen Honeydew, fictional character from the Muppet Show

Low German surnames